Guru is a 1980 Indian action adventure film directed by I. V. Sasi. The film, a bi-lingual, was made in Tamil and Telugu-languages. The film stars Kamal Haasan and Sridevi, while M. N. Nambiar, Muthuraman and Mohan Babu play supporting roles. The film opened in July 1980 to positive reviews. It was a blockbuster and completed a 365-day run at the box office. This film is a remake of the 1973 Hindi film Jugnu.

Plot 

In pre-independent India, Raghu is a revolutionary who is disowned by his aristocratic father and is presumed dead while fleeing from the police. Ten years later, Raghu's wife is shot dead by a landlord attempting to rape her, and her young boy shoots the landlord in retaliation and absconds.

Several years later, the boy has grown up to be Ashok, a rich, reputed philanthropist who runs "Parvathi Nilayam", a shelter and institute for orphaned destitute children, named after his mother. Unknown to all except his close friend and associate Mahesh is the fact that to support "Parvathi Nilayam", Ashok also masquerades as "Guru", an elusive criminal who carries out several heists and is being hunted by the police. Meanwhile, Ashok's grandfather has been raising an impostor, Ramesh as his grandson, who has turned out to be felonious.

Ashok meets and falls in love with a charming girl, Sujatha, the niece of a top police official, who strives to win her affection and succeeds. Ashok, in the guise of Guru, also tangles with a notorious mob headed by a one-armed man, one of whose associates is Ramesh. Ashok also has a chance encounter with his lost father, Raghu, who is now working as a professor, but Raghu conceals his identity to keep Ashok safe.

In a shocking twist, Ashok finds out that the landlord whom he had murdered as a boy was none other than Sujatha's father, and he starts rebuking Sujatha without revealing her the truth, leaving her heart-broken. Distraught and despondent, Ashok plans one last big heist to support "Parvathi Nilayam" permanently, hand it over to his friend Mahesh and seclude himself forever. Whether his plans succeed forms the rest of the story.

Cast 

 Kamal Haasan as Guru / Ashok
 Sridevi as Sujatha
 R. Muthuraman as Raghu, father of Ashok (Tamil)
Kaikala Satyanarayana (Telugu)
 M. N. Nambiar as head of the anti-social group (Tamil)
M. Prabhakar Reddy (Telugu)
 Major Sundarrajan as Commissioner of Police, Sujatha's uncle (Tamil)
Kanta Rao (Telugu)
 Mohan Babu as Ramesh
 Y. G. Mahendran as Mahesh, Guru's friend
 Poornam Viswanathan as Raghu's father
S. V. Ramadas as Sujatha's father
 Ceylon Manohar as Henchman
 Vennira Aadai Nirmala as Parvathi
 Pandari Bai as Sujatha's mother
 Jayamalini as Mahesh's love interest

Soundtrack 
The music was composed by Ilaiyaraaja.

Release and reception 
Gurus Tamil version was released on 18 July 1980; the Telugu version was released the day after, on 19 July. Both were critically and commercially successful. The Tamil version was also successful Sri Lanka. Kanthan of Kalki appreciated the performances of the cast, particularly Haasan.

Legacy 
The visuals for the songs "Paranthalum Vidamatten" and "Endhan Kannil" became iconic for the "technical marvel" in the former, and Sridevi's drunken comedy in the latter. In retrospect, Haasan has been critical of the film, calling it "crap".

References

External links 
 

1980 films
1980s action adventure films
1980s Indian superhero films
1980 multilingual films
1980s Tamil-language films
1980s Telugu-language films
1980s vigilante films
Fictional vigilantes
Films directed by I. V. Sasi
Films scored by Ilaiyaraaja
Indian action adventure films
Indian multilingual films
Indian vigilante films
Tamil remakes of Hindi films